Juan Cruz Díaz Espósito (born 25 April 2000), known as Juan Cruz, is a Spanish professional footballer who plays as either an attacking midfielder or a winger for La Liga side Real Betis.

Club career
Born in Quilmes, Argentina, Cruz grew up in Rincón de la Victoria, Málaga, Andalusia, and joined Málaga CF's youth setup in 2010. He made his senior debut with the reserves on 19 November 2017, coming on as a second-half substitute for Nacho Abeledo in a 5–1 Tercera División home routing of Martos CD.

Cruz made his first team – and La Liga – debut on 19 May 2018, replacing Mehdi Lacen in a 0–1 home loss against Getafe CF. On 1 July 2021, he signed a two-year contract with Real Betis after his deal with Málaga expired; he was assigned to the B-team.

Honours

International
Spain U18
Mediterranean Games: Gold Medal 2018

Notes

References

External links

2000 births
Living people
People from Quilmes
Argentine footballers
Spanish footballers
Association football wingers
Association football midfielders
La Liga players
Segunda División players
Primera Federación players
Segunda Federación players
Segunda División B players
Tercera División players
Atlético Malagueño players
Málaga CF players
Betis Deportivo Balompié footballers
Real Betis players
Spain youth international footballers
Competitors at the 2018 Mediterranean Games
Mediterranean Games gold medalists for Spain
Mediterranean Games medalists in football
Footballers from Andalusia
Sportspeople from the Province of Málaga
Sportspeople from Buenos Aires Province